Touriya Jabrane ( – born Saadia Kraytif ; 16 October 1952 – 24 August 2020) was a Moroccan theatre director, actress, and politician. She was born in Casablanca. Between 2007 and 2009, Jabrane held the position of Minister of Culture in the cabinet of Abbas El Fassi.

Jabrane died in August 2020, at age 67, from COVID-19.

See also
Cabinet of Morocco

References

1952 births
2020 deaths
People from Casablanca
Moroccan stage actresses
Moroccan film actresses
Moroccan theatre directors
Moroccan actor-politicians
Women government ministers of Morocco
21st-century Moroccan women politicians
21st-century Moroccan politicians
Deaths from the COVID-19 pandemic in Morocco